Hocalar District is a district of Afyonkarahisar Province of Turkey. Its seat is the town Hocalar. Its area is 506 km2, and its population is 9,035 (2021).

Composition
There is one municipality in Hocalar District:
 Hocalar

There are 15 villages in Hocalar District:

 Akçadere
 Avgancık
 Çalca
 Çepni
 Davulga
 Devlethan
 Güre
 İhsaniye
 Kocagöl
 Kozluca
 Örencik
 Örtülü
 Uluköy
 Yağcı
 Yeşilhisar

References

Districts of Afyonkarahisar Province